Miss Brazil 2018, officially Miss Brazil Be Emotion 2018, was the 64th edition of the Miss Brazil pageant. It was held on 26 May 2018 at Riocentro in Rio de Janeiro, and was hosted by Cássio Reis and Maria Eugênia Suconic. Monalysa Alcântara of Piauí crowned her successor Mayra Dias of Amazonas at the end of the event. Dias represented Brazil at the Miss Universe 2018 pageant and placed Top 20.

Results

Contestants

Judges

Preliminary
Karina Ades – Miss Brazil National director
Sergio Baia – Photographer
Juliana Rakoza – Makeup artist
Monalysa Alcântara – Miss Brazil 2017 from Piauí

Finals
Mariana Goldfarb – Model and presenter
Amaury Jr. – Presenter
Natália Guimarães – Miss Brasil 2007 from Minas Gerais
Gianne Albertoni – Actress
Carlos Tufvesson – Stylist
Amir Slama – Stylist
Felipe Veloso – Stylist
Heloísa Pinheiro – Businesswoman and presenter
Carla Vilhena – Journalist
Heloisa Tolipan – Journalist
Daniela Pessoa – Journalist
Kenia Maria – UN Women Ambassador

References

External links

 

2018
2018 in Brazil
2018 beauty pageants
Beauty pageants in Brazil